Goran Ivanišević defeated Patrick Rafter in the final, 6–3, 3–6, 6–3, 2–6, 9–7 to win the gentlemen's singles tennis title at the 2001 Wimbledon Championships, with the final held on the third Monday in front of a boisterous crowd, after Ivanišević's semi final against Tim Henman took three days to complete due to rain. It was Ivanišević's first and only major title. Ivanišević became the first unseeded player to win the title since Boris Becker in 1985, and the first wild card to win a Major. His ranking improved by 109 places following the win, from world No. 125 to world No. 16. Ivanišević had reached the Wimbledon final three times before (in 1992, 1994 and 1998) but lost each time.

Pete Sampras was the four-time defending champion, but he lost in the fourth round to 19-year-old Roger Federer. The Sampras-Federer match was the only time the two ever competed against each other in a professional match. This was the first major tournament at which Federer was seeded. Sampras was attempting to equal Björn Borg's record of five consecutive Wimbledon titles (which Federer would achieve in 2007).

This was the year when Wimbledon expanded from 16 to 32 seeds.

Seeds

  Pete Sampras (fourth round)
  Andre Agassi (semifinals)
  Pat Rafter (final)
  Marat Safin (quarterfinals)
  Lleyton Hewitt (fourth round)
  Tim Henman (semifinals)
  Yevgeny Kafelnikov (third round)
  Juan Carlos Ferrero (third round)
  Sébastien Grosjean (third round)
  Thomas Enqvist (quarterfinals)
  Thomas Johansson (second round)
  Jan-Michael Gambill (first round)
  Arnaud Clément (fourth round)
  Wayne Ferreira (first round)
  Roger Federer (quarterfinals)
  Vladimir Voltchkov (first round)
  Tommy Haas (first round)

  Magnus Norman (withdrew)
  Nicolas Kiefer (fourth round)
  Fabrice Santoro (third round)
  Carlos Moyá (second round)
  Dominik Hrbatý (first round)
  Todd Martin (fourth round)
  Nicolas Escudé (quarterfinals)
  Albert Portas (first round)
  Sjeng Schalken (third round)
  Hicham Arazi (third round)
  Franco Squillari (first round)
  Guillermo Coria (first round)
  Nicolás Lapentti (withdrew)
  Alberto Martín (first round)
  Gastón Gaudio (first round)
  Jonas Björkman (third round)
  Harel Levy (first round)

Magnus Norman and Nicolás Lapentti withdrew due to injury. They were replaced in the draw by the highest-ranked non-seeded players Jonas Björkman and Harel Levy, who became the #33 and #34 seeds respectively.

Qualifying

Draw

Finals

Top half

Section 1

Section 2

Section 3

Section 4

Bottom half

Section 5

Section 6

Section 7

Section 8

References

External links

 2001 Wimbledon Championships – Men's draws and results at the International Tennis Federation

Men's Singles
Wimbledon Championship by year – Men's singles